Unity, known informally as Unity Church, is an organization founded by Charles and Myrtle Fillmore in 1889. It grew out of Transcendentalism and became part of the New Thought movement. Unity is known for its Daily Word devotional publication. Unity describes itself as "for people who might call themselves spiritual but not religious."

Overview

Unity describes itself as a worldwide organization offering an approach to Christianity which teaches a positive approach to life, seeking to accept the good in all people and events. It began as a healing ministry and healing has continued to be its main emphasis. It teaches that all people can improve the quality of their lives through thought.

Unity describes itself as having no particular creed, set dogma, or required ritual. It maintains that there is good in every approach to God and in every religion that fulfills someone's needs. It holds that one should focus not on past sins but on the potential good in all.

Unity emphasizes spiritual healing, prosperity and the curing of illness by spiritual means, but it does not reject or resist medical treatments. It is accepting of the beliefs of others.

History
Unity was founded in Kansas City, Missouri, in 1889 by Charles Fillmore (1854–1948) and Myrtle Fillmore (1845–1931) after Mrs. Fillmore had been cured of her tuberculosis, she believed, by spiritual healing. This resulted in the Fillmores' studying world religions, spiritual healing, and the links between science and religion. They were influenced by Dr. E. B. Weeks, Ralph Waldo Emerson, Emma Curtis Hopkins and Mary Baker Eddy (the founder of Christian Science).

In 1891, the Fillmores named the movement Unity, and began publishing their first magazine, Unity. Later magazines included Wee Wisdom (for children) and Daily Word. Book publishing began with Lessons in Truth by H. Emilie Cady. In 1906, Mr. and Mrs. Fillmore accepted ordination and ordained seven other ministers.

After World War I, Unity Village, which became a 1,200-acre incorporated town, was developed 15 miles from Kansas City. After Charles Fillmore's death, the movement was initially led by the Fillmores’ sons and grandchildren.  It originally described itself as a "positive, practical Christianity" which "teach[es] the effective daily application of the principles of Truth taught and exemplified by Jesus Christ."

Organization
Individual Unity churches are autonomous, each governed by its own board and minister, and seeking affiliation according to guidelines. Minister training, ministerial placement, and educational resources are offered at Unity World Headquarters, which also publishes magazines, books and pamphlets. The organization's prayer ministry, Silent Unity—a telephone and email service—offers prayer and counseling.

Unity's other programs include the Unity Society of Practical Christianity, Unity School of Christianity, Unity Institute, the Office of Prayer Research, the Association of Unity Churches, and Unity House, the church's publishing arm. Its headquarters are at Unity Village, Missouri, a suburb of Kansas City.

Each Unity Church sponsors its own chapter of Youth of Unity (YOU), a group of high school-aged teens who come together to learn Unity principles and spiritual practices. All the chapters in a YOU region meet at least once a year for a weekend retreat called a 'rally.' A seven-day International YOU Conference is held each summer at Unity headquarters at Unity Village, Missouri.

Basic teachings

Unity's belief system is expressed as "The Five Principles." They are:
God is all there is and present everywhere. This is the force of love and wisdom that underlies all of existence.
Human beings are divine at their core and therefore inherently good.
Thoughts have creative power to determine events and attract experiences.
Prayer and meditation keep us aligned with the one great power in the universe.
It is not enough to understand spiritual teachings. We must live the Truth we know.

Unity aims to demonstrate that the teachings of Jesus Christ can be lived every day. Its followers believe that the true "Church" is a "state of consciousness in mankind." Unity teaches that each person is a unique expression of God and is sacred and worthy. It emphasizes the creative power of thought, and encourages taking personal responsibility to choose life-affirming thoughts, words and actions, to experience a more fulfilling and abundant life.

H. Emilie Cady's 1896 book Lessons in Truth, A Course of Twelve Lessons in Practical Christianity is considered a core text of Unity.

God

Unity Church views God as spiritual energy which is present everywhere and is available to all people. Members of the church believe that God seeks only to express the highest good through everyone and everything. According to Unity co-founder Charles Fillmore:

He later wrote that:

Jesus

Unity Church followers believe in the divinity of Jesus.
They believe that Jesus Christ is the Son of God, the master teacher who demonstrated divinity and came to teach humankind, and that Jesus is the great example of God in physical form.

Nature of humanity

Unity Church teaches that all people are individual, eternal expressions of God, and that their essential nature is divine and therefore inherently good. Followers believe their purpose in life is to express their divine potential as demonstrated by Jesus, and that the more they awaken to their divine nature, the more they can do this. Salvation, in the Unity view, is found in consciously understanding one's innate divinity, then putting that knowledge into practice in one's life.

Bible

Unity founders Charles and Myrtle Fillmore studied the Bible as history and allegory. They interpreted it as a metaphysical representation of each soul's evolutionary journey toward spiritual awakening. Unity considers the Bible a valuable spiritual resource, a complex collection of writings compiled over many centuries, and a reflection of the comprehension and inspiration of the writers and their times.

Affirmative prayer

Affirmative prayer is understood, in Unity, as the highest form of creative thought; that it includes the release of negative thoughts and the holding in mind of statements of spiritual truth. Unity teaches the use of meditation and prayer as a way to experience the presence of God, heighten the awareness of truth, and thereby transform lives. According to poet James Dillet Freeman:
Prayer is valuable not because it alters the circumstances and conditions of your life, but because it alters you.

Unity teaches that it is helpful to pray with the belief that we have already received all that we need, that through prayer the mind is renewed and the body transformed, and that awareness that we are conscious creators of our lives is the bridge from the old Christianity, where we are "sinners", to the new understanding that we are "learners." The Unity School of Christianity holds that prayer is not a way to inform God of one's troubles, or to receive favors or preferential treatment, but to align one's self with the power that is God.

Relationship to Christianity
Unity emphasizes its agreements, not differences, with traditional Christians and stresses its concurrence with the teachings of Jesus and the Bible. According to Unity co-founder Charles Fillmore:

It has been generally accepted that Jesus' great works were miracles and that the power to do miracles was delegated to His immediate followers only.  In recent years many of Jesus' followers have inquired into His healing methods, and they have found that healing is based on universal mental and spiritual laws which anyone can utilize who will comply with the conditions involved in these laws.

Unity considers itself a non-sectarian educational institution, although Unity ministers are ordained following their prescribed courses and training.

Notable members

Well-known people affiliated with Unity include Della Reese,  Betty White, Eleanor Powell, Lucie Arnaz, David Friedman, Wally Amos, actress Michael Learned, Licensed Unity Teacher Ruth Warrick, Barbara Billingsley, Theodore Schneider, Erykah Badu, Matt Hoverman, author Victoria Moran, Patricia Neal, Johnnie Colemon, and Maya Angelou.

See also
 Universal Foundation for Better Living

References

Further reading
Berry, Harold J. (1975). Unity School of Christianity: What's Christian about It?. Lincoln, Neb.: Back to the Bible Publications. 
Fillmore, Charles (1931). Metaphysical Bible Dictionary. Unity Village, Mo.: Unity School of Christianity. 

Fillmore, Charles ([19--]). The Adventure Called Unity. Unity Village, Mo.: Unity. Without ISBN

 Mosley, Glenn R. (2006). The History and Future NEW THOUGHT, ANCIENT WISDOM of the New Thought Movement, Templeton Foundation Press.

External links
 Official website of Unity World Headquarters
 Official website of the Unity Church in Australia
 Official website of the Unity Church in New Zealand
 Official Website of the Unity Church in the UK
 Daily Word:– Daily Bible Study Devotional Guide by the Unity Church
 Lessons in Truth, A Course of Twelve Lessons in Practical Christianity
 TruthUnity:– A repository of audio, video and text of Unity resources

 
1889 establishments in Missouri
New religious movements
New Thought denominations
Religious organizations established in 1889
Religious belief systems founded in the United States